Buttenwieser is a surname. Notable people with the surname include:

Benjamin Buttenwieser (1900–1991), American banker, philanthropist, and civic leader
Helen Lehman Buttenwieser (1905–1989), American lawyer and philanthropist
Joseph L. Buttenwieser (1865–1938), American lawyer, philanthropist, and civic leader
Laemmlein Buttenwieser (1825–1901), German-born Talmudist and linguist